{{Infobox person
| name         = Víkingur Kristjánsson
| image        = 
| alt          = 
| caption      =
| birth_name   = 
| birth_date   = 
| birth_place  = Neskaupstaður, Iceland
| citizenship  = Icelandic
| other_names  =
| occupation   = 
| known_for    = TrappedThe Valhalla MurdersVegferðRéttur| children     = 
| years_active = 1998–present
}}

Víkingur Kristjánsson (born 26 March 1972) is an Icelandic actor and screenwriter. He is known for Trapped, The Valhalla Murders, Vegferð, Réttur and Ríkið''. He was one of the founders of the theatre group Vesturport.

Early life 
Víkingur was born Neskaupstaður and lived in Eskifjörður for his first two years until he moved to Ísafjörður where he lived until he turned 16-years old. His father died in the 1986 Ljósufjöll air crash.

Filmography

References

External links
 

Living people
1972 births
Vikingur Kristjansson
Vikingur Kristjansson
Vikingur Kristjansson
Vikingur Kristjansson